Aurélien Scheidler (born 4 June 1998) is a French professional footballer who plays as a forward for  club Bari.

Career
On 13 April 2019, Scheidler signed his first professional contract with Orléans. He made his professional debut with the club in a 1–0 Ligue 2 loss to Chambly on 2 August 2019.

On 1 September 2022, Scheidler signed in Italy for Serie B club Bari.

References

External links
 
 
 

Living people
1998 births
Sportspeople from Pas-de-Calais
French footballers
Footballers from Hauts-de-France
Association football forwards
Ligue 1 players
Ligue 2 players
Championnat National players
Championnat National 3 players
Serie B players
US Orléans players
US Boulogne players
Dijon FCO players
AS Nancy Lorraine players
S.S.C. Bari players
French expatriate footballers
Expatriate footballers in Italy